Žvižej is a Slovene surname. Notable people with the surname include:

Luka Žvižej (born 1980), Slovenian handball player
Miha Žvižej (born 1987), Slovenian handball player, brother of Luka

Slovene-language surnames